Maryam Ado Mohammed, also known as Maryam Booth (born 28 October 1993) is a Nigerian actress and model, best known for her role in The Milkmaid (film) (2020), which was Nigeria's representative for the best international feature category at the Academy Awards. For her role as "Zainab" in the film, she won the Africa Movie Academy Award for Best Actress in a Supporting Role.

Early life and education
Maryam was born on 28 October 1993, in Kano, Kano State. Two of her siblings, as well as her late mother Zainab Booth are also professional actors. In an interview with BellaNaija, she disclosed that she's been acting since she was 8 years.

Career
She hosted the 2019 edition of the Best of Nollywood Awards. In 2020, Maryam won the best supporting actress category at the Africa Movie Academy Awards. Her performance in the expertly directed film by Desmond Obviagele earned her the title of Best Supporting Actress at the recently held 2017 edition of the esteemed Africa Movie Academy Awards (AMAA).

References

External links
 

1993 births
Living people
Nigerian film actresses
21st-century Nigerian actresses
Actresses in Hausa cinema
Kannywood actors
Hausa people
Nigerian models
Nigerian female models
Actresses from Kano State
People from Kano State
African actors